Mylopotamos is a municipality in Rethymno regional unit, on Crete, southern Greece. The seat of the municipality is the village Perama.

Municipality 
The municipality Mylopotamos was formed at the 2011 local government reform by the merger of the following 3 former municipalities, which became municipal units:
 Geropotamos
 Kouloukonas
 Zoniana
 Anogia

Former Province 
The province of Mylopotamos was one of the provinces of Rethymno Prefecture. Its territory corresponded with that of the current municipalities Mylopotamos and Anogeia. It was abolished in 2006.

Ecclesiastical history 
Modern Lefterna was the seat since 1212 of a Latin Roman Catholic Diocese of Milopotamus, which was suppressed in 1669 and turned into a Latin Titular bishopric of lowest (episcopal), which had its name changed in the 20th century into titular see of Eleutherna.

See also 
Vosakou Monastery

References 

Municipalities of Crete
Provinces of Greece
Populated places in Rethymno (regional unit)